Making History is an album by the dub poet Linton Kwesi Johnson. It was released in 1984 on Island Records. It was produced by Dennis Bovell.

Critical reception 
Trouser Press called the album "as vital as any [Johnson and Bovell] had made together." The New York Times wrote: "Dennis Bovell ... has fashioned settings for the poems on Making History that draw their melodies directly from the inflections and intonation of the lines. Most selections sport catchy instrumental melodies that weave in and out of the poetry, making it sound much like song."

NME ranked it number 16 among the "Albums of the Year" for 1984.

Track listing 
All tracks written by Linton Kwesi Johnson

"Di Eagle an' di Bear" – 4:14
"Wat About di Working Claas?" – 5:12
"Di Great Insohreckshan" – 4:02
"Making History" – 4:19
"Reggae fi Radni" – 4:24
"Reggae fi Dada" – 4:50
"New Craas Massahkah" – 6:30

Personnel 
Linton Kwesi Johnson - voice
The Dub Band
Dennis Bovell - bass, mixing
Richie Stevens - drums
John Kpiaye - guitar
Paget King - keyboards
Nick Straker - synthesizer
Patrick Tenyue - trumpet
Henry "Buttons" Tenyue - trombone
Geoffrey Scantlebury - percussion
Tony Utah - other percussion
Everald Forrest - other percussion
Technical
Dennis Bovell, Godwin Logie, Martin Rex, Stephen Street - engineers
Bruno Tilley - artwork
Peter Ashworth - photography

Charts 
Album

References 

Island Records albums
1983 albums
Linton Kwesi Johnson albums